is a Japanese mecha media franchise created by Ken Ishikawa and Go Nagai. An anime television series produced by Toei Animation was broadcast on Fuji TV from April 4, 1974, to May 8, 1975, with a total of 51 episodes. The manga was serialized in Shogakukan's Weekly Shōnen Sunday from April 7, 1974, to August 24, 1975, and was compiled in six volumes by Shogakukan and three volumes by Futabasha.

Plot

The plot involves three strong-willed teenagers: Ryoma Nagare, Hayato Jin and Musashi Tomoe, who pilot three specially designed combat jets (Eagle, Jaguar, and Bear) which can be combined into three different giant robots, Getter-1 (balanced and for flight combat), Getter-2 (fast and for ground combat), and Getter-3 (strong and for marine combat). They were assembled by Prof. Saotome, who conceived the Getter Robo project as a means of deep-space exploration. The Getter machine is powered by an energy source known as Getter Rays, which are the invisible manifestation of the pilot's willpower. It became instead Earth's first line of defense against the Dinosaur Empire, a civilization of reptile-like humanoids who evolved from the now-extinct dinosaurs that roamed the earth millions of years ago. They have lived many years underground after being forced to do so by getter ray radiation from space that did not affect the apes who evolved into humans; they now want to reclaim the Earth as theirs and destroy humanity.

Volume list
Shogakukan has compiled the series' chapters into 6 tankōbon volumes. The first four volumes compile the chapters of the Dinosaur Empire arc (equivalent to the Getter Robo anime story) while the last two volumes compiles the chapters of the Hundred Demons Empire arc (equivalent to the Getter Robo G anime story). The manga was re-released in 3 aizōban volumes by Futabasha in 2002.

Futabasha edition

Sequels and remakes

Getter Robo G
The last episode of the Getter Robo series showed the defeat of the Dinosaur Empire, but with a high price: the death of one of the Getter Robo pilots, Musashi Tomoe. It also introduced a new enemy, the Clan of the 100 Demons, who at that very moment were preparing an invasion of Earth from space. This would be the basis of a sequel with a new, improved version of the original robot, piloted by Ryoma, Hayato, and newcomer pilot Benkei Kuruma. The series, called Getter Robo G, would not be as long and successful as the first one, lasting 39 episodes. The new robot and its pilots were also featured in the Go Nagai short features Great Mazinger vs. Getter Robo G and Grendizer, Getter Robo G & Great Mazinger: Decisive Showdown! Great Sea Beast, despite the fact Getter Robo was conceived as existing in a different universe from the Mazinger/Grendizer continuity.

G also became famous in the U.S. as it was included in edited form as part of the Force Five robot series produced for the American market, where its name was changed to Starvengers. These episodes would later be the basis for the direct to video series; Robo Formers.  Additionally, toys based on the Getter Robo mecha were licensed by the U.S. toy company Mattel and sold under the company's Shogun Warriors toy line.

There was a limited video release of Starvengers in the UK, renamed Formators.

Getter Robo Go
After some years, the franchise was revived in 1991 with the new series Getter Robo Go, directed by Hiroki Shibata, and featuring a new robot and an all-new team. While originally planned as a remake of Mazinger Z, sponsor Yutaka Nakamura turned instead to rebooting Getter Robo, with the anime focusing on a new Getter Team, Go Ichimonji, Sho Tachibana and Gai Daido, fighting the forces of Prof. Rando and his Metal Beasts. At the same time, Nagai and Ishikawa penned a 7 volume Getter Robo Go manga from 1990 to 1993, with a dramatically different plot, albeit sharing several characters. The Go manga continued the story of the original 1970's installments, and later featured the debut of the Shin Getter Robo in its final 3 volumes.  Many products were released, such as CDs, toys, video cassettes, and later a DVD set. In addition to that, this was the first time Go Nagai and Toei Animation began working together since the Gaiking incident.

In the advent of Getter Robo Go's success, the influence and popularity of the original show continued in Japan, and it found a way to stay with fans through video games (like the Super Robot Wars game series, in which the Getter Robo is one of its lineup mainstays) and other merchandise. The series was even spoofed successfully in the mecha anime series Martian Successor Nadesico, where the anime-within-anime Gekiganger III was a direct pun (and homage) to the Getter Robo legacy, among many other super robot series. Gekiganger III was the favorite show of the character Gai in Martian Successor Nadesico. His voice actor, Tomokazu Seki, has also said that Getter Robo is his favorite anime. Tomokazu Seki would also voice Go (the protagonist of Getter Robo Go) in Getter Robo Armageddon.

Shin Getter Robo
After the ending of Getter Robo Go, Ishikawa, motivated by his editor Kazuki Nakashima, decided to extend and explain some topics, like what really happened to Benkei and the Saotome Institute, the reason Ryoma was scared of Getter Rays, what Getter is and such.
The series features the return of the original Getter Robo, alongside Getter Robo G, the latter of whom had mysteriously vanished alongside Benkei as of the events of Getter Go.
The manga would also feature the first full look at Shin Getter 2, who had made a brief appearance in Getter Go, and the first ever appearance of Shin Getter 3. 
Additionally, it featured new insect-like enemies from the far future, later used in Getter Arc, which would also revisit the fate of Getter G.
All of this was told in the Getter Robo Go manga prequel, Shin Getter Robo, begun in 1996 and lasted 2 tankōbon volumes. The title was later reprinted into a single aizōban volume of 500 pages.

Getter Robo Arc
Getter Robo Arc is a 3-volume manga taking place in a science fiction post-apocalyptic futuristic setting. Unfortunately, Super Robot Comics, the magazine in which Arc was published, was canceled and the story ended prematurely. On November 2, 2020, an anime adaptation of Arc was announced for a Summer 2021 release, it will produced by Bee Media with Jun Kawagoe as director.

Getter Robo Armageddon
The concept was re-invented in 1998 with the retro-styled OVA Change Getter Robo!!: The Last Day of the World (released outside Japan as Getter Robo: Armageddon). Giant Robo director Yasuhiro Imagawa was to direct the OVA, but had a falling out with the studio after Episode 3. This would lead to Jun Kawagoe taking over as the director from episode 4 onwards, a position he would keep throughout the following 2 OVAs. The OVA ran 13 episodes and was presented as the sequel to a story - which was never actually animated - about the Getter Team fighting a race of amorphous aliens called "Invaders." This production made use of an animation style reminiscent of the old Getter Robo and other 1970s anime shows with thick, sketchy lines, albeit with character and robot designs more reminiscent of Ken Ishikawa's original manga.

Shin Getter Robo vs Neo Getter Robo
Two years later, the same staff returned for the four-part OVA Shin Getter Robo vs Neo Getter Robo. The plot of the OVA is loosely based on the original Getter Robo, with the Dinosaur Empire as the antagonists. The OVA introduces a new Getter Robo, the titular Neo Getter Robo, which is similar in design to the Getter Robo from Getter Robo Go and also shares elements of Getter Robo G's design. In addition, it features characters from Getter Robo Go that are closer in personality to those found in the original manga than the anime adaptation. The OVA also included a three part miniseries that lasted five minutes called Dynamic Super Robot's Grand Battle which shows several Go Nagai created robots doing battle with the Mycene empire from the anime Great Mazinger. The short included appearances by Getter Robo G and Shin Getter Robo.

New Getter Robo
In 2004, director Jun Kawagoe produced a new OVA called New Getter Robo, this time being a re-telling of the Getter Robo story.
In this new story, humanity is under attack by demonic creatures called Oni. As in the original stories, Dr. Saotome creates a series of Getter-Ray-powered robots to fight the monsters, culminating the creation of Getter Robo. Both the robot and the Getter Team were redesigned for the new series. Getter Robo is more detailed and mechanical-looking than its earlier forms, and all three pilots - Ryoma, Hayato, and a combination of Musashi and Benkei's archetypes named "Benkei Musashibo" - are as violent and antiheroic as they were in the 70s manga. Ryoma is now an irresponsible street fighter, Hayato a bloodthirsty, sadistic terrorist, and Benkei a hedonistic and gluttonous apprentice monk.

Getter Robo Hien
In 2007, a new manga entitled Getter Robo Hien: The Earth Suicide was released in Japan.  It has since concluded at 3 volumes, and was serialized in a monthly webcomic.  This series continues the Ken Ishikawa continuity of Getter manga, temporally taking place after Getter Robo Go and before Getter Arc. The series features an older Hayato leading a new team of Getter Pilots (and a new Getter) as they defend the earth from large plant-like monsters.

Apocrypha Getter Robo
Dash
In July 2008 a new manga entitled Apocrypha Getter Robot Dash was released in Japan, in Magazine Z, authored by Hideaki Nishikawa. Owing Magazine Z being cancelled, it continues as Apocrypha Getter Robo DARKNESS.

Darkness
Apocrypha Getter Robo Darkness is actually Getter Robot Dash, continuing with another title on Young Animal Arashi after Magazine Z was cancelled. The chapter 0 of Getter Robo DARKNESS, published in the July 2009 issue of the magazine, is actually a reprint of the sixth chapter of Getter Robo DASH, the last one published in Magazine Z.

List of Getter Robo series

Manga

Anime

Video games
The various Getter Robos are mainstay characters in the Super Robot Wars series by Banpresto, usually found in the super deformed style which the series is popular for; Getter appeared in almost every non-original exclusive installment with Gundam and Mazinger (except for Judgement, K, L, UX, BX, and X, in which Getter does not take part). The Getter Robos also received their own turn based strategy game similar to the Super Robot Wars series for the Sony PlayStation titled Getter Robo Daikessen!. This game featured the various versions of Getter Robo from the manga and anime and OVAs produced until that point, as well as an original pink mecha piloted by a trio of ninja women. Shin Getter and Black Getter are included in Another Century's Episode 3, which features the storyline of Getter Robo Armageddon.

Legacy
In an interview with Kazuki Nakashima, the writer of Gurren Lagann and chief editor on the Getter Robo Saga compilation, Getter Robo was cited as one of Gurren Laganns main inspirations. Video game company SNK also commented they were influenced by the series when designing the three main characters of The King of Fighters '94.

Notes

References

External links
 

 
1974 anime television series debuts
1974 manga
ADV Films
Fuji TV original programming
Shogakukan manga
Shunsuke Kikuchi
Super robot anime and manga
Toei Animation television
Shōnen manga